= Committee on Public Lands =

The Committee on Public Lands may refer to predecessors of current committees in the two houses of the United States Congress:

- United States Senate Committee on Energy and Natural Resources, formerly known as the Senate Committee on Public Lands
- United States House Committee on Natural Resources, formerly known as the House Committee on Public Lands
